1. SC Znojmo FK is a football club from the South Moravian town of Znojmo, Czech Republic. After the 2018–19 season, the club was relegated into the Moravian–Silesian Football League (third level league).

History
Znojmo won promotion from the Czech Fourth Division in 2002, finishing first in Division D in the 2001–02 season. The club followed this with eight seasons in the Moravian–Silesian Football League, before winning another promotion in 2010 under manager Michal Sobota. The club secured promotion to the Czech 2. Liga two matches before the end of 2009–10 season. Znojmo replaced Sobota in the summer of 2010, partly due to him not having a coaching license for professional football. His replacement was Bohumil Smrček.

Two relatively unsuccessful seasons followed under Smrček, with the club finishing 14th and 13th respectively. This prompted the club to replace Smrček with new manager Leoš Kalvoda. Kalvoda went on to lead the club to a first-place finish in the 2012–13 Czech 2. Liga and Znojmo celebrated promotion from the Czech 2. Liga, winning the right to play in the top flight for the first time in their history. They finished bottom of the 2013–14 Czech First League, and played all of their matches in Brno (aside from one which was played in Jihlava) due to their own stadium not meeting league requirements.

Historical names 
 1953 – DSO Rudá Hvězda Znojmo
 1969 – TJ Rudá Hvězda Znojmo
 1990 – SKP Znojmo-Práče (after incorporation of TJ Sokol Práče)
 1992 – SKPP Znojmo
 1993 – VTJ SKP Znojmo
 1994 – VTJ Znojmo-Rapotice (after incorporation of TJ Sokol Rapotice, 1997 Sokol Rapotice split again)
 1995 – VTJ Znojmo
 1999 – Fotbal Znojmo
 2001 – 1. SC Znojmo (after incorporation of FC Znojmo)

Stadium 

Znojmo's home stadium is Městský stadion (Znojmo). Due to the stadium not meeting required Czech First League standards, upon the club's promotion to the league in 2013, it was announced that Znojmo would play league matches at Brno's Městský fotbalový stadion Srbská until their own stadium was of a sufficient standard.

Players

Current squad

Notable former players 

 Robert Caha
 Patrik Siegl
 Libor Sionko
 Michal Špit
 Cedrick Mugisha

Managers

 Jiří Fryš (1988–92)
 Josef Čech (1993)
 Jiří Fryš (1993–98)
 Michal Sobota (2006–10)
 Bohumil Smrček (2010–12)
 Leoš Kalvoda (2012–14)
 Oldřich Machala (2014)

 Ludevít Grmela (2014–15)
 Radim Kučera (2015–17)
 Jiří Balcárek (2017–2018)
 Leoš Kalvoda (2018)
 František Šturma (2019)
 Leoš Kalvoda (2019)
 Milan Volf (2019–)

History in domestic competitions 

 Seasons spent at Level 1 of the football league system: 1
 Seasons spent at Level 2 of the football league system: 8
 Seasons spent at Level 3 of the football league system: 8
 Seasons spent at Level 4 of the football league system: 1

Czech Republic

Honours 
Czech 2. Liga (second tier)
 Champions 2012–13
Moravian–Silesian Football League (third tier)
 Champions 2009–10
Czech Fourth Division (fourth tier)
 Champions 2001–02

References

External links
  

Znojmo
Association football clubs established in 2001